Megan Sullivan McInerney (born 6 July 1990 in Sydney), known by her stage name Meg Mac, is an Australian singer-songwriter and musician. She signed to littleBIGMAN Records in 2014, locally, and 300 Entertainment in United States.

Early career
Mac started developing her singing as soon as she could speak. She started writing songs as a teen. She began a degree in Digital Media but soon quit this after she moved to Perth to study music at the WA Academy of Performing Arts. After completing her degree, she recorded "Known Better" and submitted it to Triple J's Unearthed program. At this point, she decided to move from Perth to Melbourne and left on a road trip with a car load of friends. It was during this trip as they were approaching Melbourne that she discovered that Triple J were planning to play her song that evening.
Meg Mac was educated at The McDonald Performing Arts College in Sydney Australia.

Musical career

2013–2017: Career beginnings and Low Blows
The initial exposure on Triple J catapulted Mac's musical career. She was the Unearthed Featured Artist of the Week in 2013 and Unearthed Artist of the Year in 2014.

In July 2014, Mac announced her first national headline tour to promote her debut extended play, MegMac, which was issued on 12 September that year on littleBIGMAN Records. On Triple J, the national youth radio station, she was announced as their "Unearthed Artist of 2014", while Marie Claire Australia chose her as an "Artist to Watch" for 2015 and she received a nomination for Rolling Stone Australias "Best New Talent" Award.

She was reviewed by The New York Times, BuzzFeed, and Daytrotter. Mac toured supporting Clean Bandit.

On 15 August 2015, Mac achieved her first top 50 chart appearance with "Never Be", which entered the ARIA Singles Chart at No. 39. It out-peaked her first top 100 single, "Roll Up Your Sleeves", which had reached No. 80 in August 2014. At the ARIA Music Awards of 2015 she was nominated for Best Female Artist for MEGMAC and Breakthrough Artist for "Never Be". On 26 January 2016, "Never Be" made it to No.11 on the Triple J Hottest 100.

Mac's debut album Low Blows was released on 14 July 2017, and entered the ARIA Chart at No.2

2018–2021: Hope
In October 2018, Mac released the single "Give Me My Name Back" which she told Billboard "is a song for those who have suffered emotional and physical abuse; it's for the women who are standing up and speaking out, those discriminated against in the LGBTQI community, the indigenous people of Australia and the children abused by the church. For everyone who has lost an important part of themselves and need to reclaim their identity, dignity and self-worth to move forward with their lives." Her second studio album was announced on 12 April 2019 under the title Hope.

2022: Matter of Time
In March 2022, Mac released "Is It Worth Being Sad" with Mac saying "I was running away from my troubles. I was living in peace and quiet finally and really thought I'd figured it all out, and it was all smooth sailing ahead. It was the start of sorting out my life. This song was like my first step—I didn't know it then, though." This was followed by "On My Mind" on 30 March 2022 and an Australian tour announcement, commencing in May. In July 2022, Mac announced her third studio album Matter of Time, which was released on 16 September 2022. The album was proceeded by the singles "Is It Worth Being Sad", "On Your Mind", "Only Love", "Letter" and "Understand". The album debuted at number 1 on the ARIA Charts.

On 29 November 2022, Mac released a five-track live EP titled Live At Golden Retriever.

Discography

 Low Blows (2017)
 Hope (2019)
 Matter of Time (2022)

Tours
Headlining Australian Tour (2014)
Low Blows Australian Tour (2017)
Give Me My Name Back Tour (2018–2019)
On My Mind Tour (2022)

Awards and nominations

AIR Awards
The Australian Independent Record Awards (commonly known informally as AIR Awards) is an annual awards night to recognise, promote and celebrate the success of Australia's Independent Music sector.

|-
| AIR Awards of 2014
| herself
| Breakthrough Independent Artist
| 
|-

J Awards
The J Awards are an annual series of Australian music awards that were established by the Australian Broadcasting Corporation's youth-focused radio station Triple J. They commenced in 2005.

! 
|-
| 2014
| herself
| Unearthed Artist of the Year
| 
| 
|-
| 2017
| Low Blows
| Australian Album of the Year
| 
| 
|-
| 2022
| Matter of Time
|Australian Album of the Year
| 
| 
|-

MTV Europe Music Awards
The MTV Europe Music Awards is an award presented by Viacom International Media Networks to honour artists and music in pop culture.

|-
| 2017
| herself 
| Best Australian Act
| 
|-

Music Victoria Awards
The Music Victoria Awards are an annual awards night celebrating Victorian music. They commenced in 2006.

! 
|-
| Music Victoria Awards of 2017
| Meg Mac
| Best Female Artist
| 
| 
|-

National Live Music Awards
The National Live Music Awards (NLMAs) are a broad recognition of Australia's diverse live industry, celebrating the success of the Australian live scene. The awards commenced in 2016.

|-
| National Live Music Awards of 2016
| herself
| International Live Achievement (Solo)
| 
|-
| National Live Music Awards of 2017
| herself
| Live Voice of the Year
| 
|-
| National Live Music Awards of 2019
| herself
| International Live Achievement (Solo)
| 
|-

Vanda & Young Global Songwriting Competition
The Vanda & Young Global Songwriting Competition is an annual competition that "acknowledges great songwriting whilst supporting and raising money for Nordoff-Robbins" and is coordinated by Albert Music and APRA AMCOS. It commenced in 2009.

|-
| 2014
| "Roll Up Your Sleeves"
| Vanda & Young Global Songwriting Competition
| style="background:silver;"| 2nd

References

External links
 

1990 births
21st-century Australian singers
21st-century Australian women singers
Alternative rock singers
Australian women pop singers
Australian indie pop musicians
Living people
Musicians from Melbourne